Lanistes neritoides is a species of large freshwater snail, an aquatic gastropod mollusk with a gill and an operculum in the family Ampullariidae, the apple snails.

It is endemic to the Republic of the Congo.

References

Ampullariidae
Invertebrates of the Republic of the Congo
Endemic fauna of the Republic of the Congo
Freshwater snails of Africa
Gastropods described in 1990
Taxonomy articles created by Polbot